Deśi words, also known as Deśya words (Sanskrit: देश्य), represent the vocabulary in Indo-Aryan languages which are of non-Indo-European origin, mostly borrowed from Dravidian languages and Munda languages, the languages which are currently native to South India and East India respectively. They are also known as  words (Hindi: देशज), and considered one of the three etymological classes defined by native grammarians of Middle Indo-Aryan languages, alongside tatsama and tadbhava words. The word "desi" in this context means "local" (or "of the countryside"), referring that these loanwords are from the native languages of the Indian subcontinent that existed before the Indo-Aryan migrations.

See also 

 Substratum in Vedic Sanskrit

References 

Linguistic history of India
Etymology
Sanskrit words and phrases